Georges Biscot  (15 September 1889 – 18 December 1944) was a French film actor. He starred in some 28 films between 1916 and his death in 1944.

He appeared in films such as Barrabas in 1920, and he died on 18 December 1944  in Paris.

Filmography
(incomplete)
 Barrabas (1920)
 Le p'tit Parigot (1926)
 Clochard (1932)
 600,000 Francs a Month (1933)
 Untel père et fils (The Heart of a Nation, 1943)

External links 

1889 births
1944 deaths
French male film actors
French male silent film actors
Male actors from Paris
20th-century French male actors